The Bernal Lecture was an annual lecture on the social function of science organised by the Royal Society of London and endowed by Professor John Desmond Bernal. It was last delivered in 2004, after which it was merged with the Wilkins Lecture and Medawar Lecture to form the Wilkins-Bernal-Medawar Lecture.

List of lecturers

References 

Royal Society lecture series
Annual events in the United Kingdom